946 Poësia  is a Themis asteroid and slow rotator, approximately  in diameter, located in the outer regions of the asteroid belt. The F-type asteroid has a long rotation period of 108.5 hours. It was named after the goddess of poetry.

Orbit and classification 

Poësia is a core member of the Themis family, a very large family of carbonaceous asteroids, named after 24 Themis. It orbits the Sun in the outer asteroid belt at a distance of 2.7–3.6 AU once every 5 years and 6 months (2,011 days; semi-major axis of 3.12 AU). Its orbit has an eccentricity of 0.14 and an inclination of 1° with respect to the ecliptic. The body's observation arc begins at Heidelberg Observatory on 11 May 1921, or three months after its official discovery observation.

Naming 

This minor planet was named after the goddess of poetry.

Physical characteristics 

In the Tholen classification, Poësia is an uncommon F-type asteroid, though with an unusual spectrum, while in the Barucci taxonomy, it is a carbonaceous C0-type. The overall spectral type for members of the Themistian family is that of a C-type.

Rotation period 

In January 2009, a rotational lightcurve of Poësia was obtained from photometric observations by Robert Stephens at the Santana Observatory  and Goat Mountain Astronomical Research Station  in California. Lightcurve analysis gave an exceptionally long rotation period of  hours with a brightness amplitude of  magnitude. A few weeks later, Gary A. Vander Haagen at Stonegate Observatory  determined an ambiguous period of 73.5 or 102.9 hours with an amplitude of  magnitude, while René Roy measured a tentative period of 48 hours. With a best-rated period of 108.5 hours, Poësia is a slow rotator. While the slowest rotators have periods above 1000 hours, the vast majority of asteroids have periods between 2.2 and 20 hours.

Diameter and albedo 

The Collaborative Asteroid Lightcurve Link adopts the results from IRAS, that is, an albedo of 0.0627 and a diameter of 43.75 km based on an absolute magnitude of 9.8.

References

External links 
 Lightcurve Database Query (LCDB), at www.minorplanet.info
 Dictionary of Minor Planet Names, Google books
 Asteroids and comets rotation curves, CdR – Geneva Observatory, Raoul Behrend
 Discovery Circumstances: Numbered Minor Planets (1)-(5000) – Minor Planet Center
 
 

000946
Discoveries by Max Wolf
Named minor planets
000946
000946
19210211